Veen may refer to:

Surname 
 Hans-Joachim Veen (born 1944), German political scientist 
 Hendrik Veen (1823–1905), Dutch photographer in the Dutch East Indies
  (born 1937), Dutch ballet dancer and actress
 Stephan Veen (born 1970), Dutch field hockey player
 Tom Veen (1942–2014), Dutch politician
 Zac Veen (born 2001), American baseball player

Other uses 
 Veen, Netherlands, a village in the municipality of Altena
 Veen Media, a Dutch media company
 VEEN, a Finnish bottled water brand
 Veen Observatory, south of Lowell, Michigan, United States

See also
Van Veen, Dutch surname
Van der Veen, Dutch surname

Dutch-language surnames